Devran Tanaçan (born November 17, 1986 in İstanbul, Turkey) is a Turkish basketball player for Galatasaray. She is 195 cm (6 ft 5 in) tall and weighs 90 kg (200 lb).

Honors
Turkish Championship
Winners (5): 2004, 2009, 2010, 2011, 2012
Turkish Cup
Winners (2): 2004, 2009
Turkish Presidents Cup
Winners (2): 2003, 2010

Professional career
On 8 August 2022, she signed with Galatasaray of the Turkish Women's Basketball Super League (TKBL).

References

External links
Player Profile at fenerbahce.org
Player profile at fibaeurope.com

1986 births
Living people
Turkish women's basketball players
Fenerbahçe women's basketball players
Centers (basketball)
Galatasaray S.K. (women's basketball) players